Perry High School is a public high school in Perry Township, Ohio, United States near Massillon. It is the only public high school in the Perry Local School District in Stark County.

Athletics

 1991 - boys basketball state semi-finalists
 2012 - baseball district champions
8 Times Federal League Baseball Champions
 2010 OHSAA Division 1 State Softball Champions (first OHSAA team title in school history)
 Intermat Wrestling has the 2013 Panther Wrestling team ranked #7 Nationally
 2013 - Girls 4x400 State Champions and New County Record 3:48.59 (Strickland, Genetin, Dearing, Luke)
 2014 State Wrestling Champions - Dual Meet.
 2015 & 2016 OHSAA Division II football state finalists
18 Times Federal League Football Champions
 2018 OHSAA Division I Softball State Champions
 2021 OHSAA Division I Softball State Champions

Speech and debate 

The Perry Speech and Debate Team won the Ohio Speech and Debate Association State Title in 2004, 2005, 2007, 2008, 2018, 2019, and 2020. They are one of the most prolific teams in the state, and recently broke the 500 club for at least 500 NSDA letters and degrees. They have had multiple individual state champions as well.

Arts

The Perry High School Marching Band has qualified for OMEA State Finals in 2011, 2012, 2013, 2014, 2015, 2016, 2017, 2018, 2019, and 2021. The marching class of 2017 was the first to receive superior ratings all 4 years at states. The Perry High School Marching Band has earned consistent superior ratings since 2013. The Symphonic Winds have earned superior ratings in Class AA and A over 37 times.  In 1991, The Perry Symphonic Winds performed at the Midwest International Band and Orchestra clinic, and performed at the OMEA State Convention in 2015.

There are also a large array of choirs at Perry, including Bel Canto, Lyrics, Kinsmen, Treblemakers, as well as Symphonic. These choirs perform numerous concerts ranging from classical to popular music. Over the years, these choirs have competed at state competitions multiple times.

The Perry Theatre was christened the "Little Broadway" of Stark County by the Canton Repository. The term was highlighted as part of a feature article reporting the yearly successes, sell-out crowds and continued demand for tickets that the Perry Theatre had established over the years. Theatre Students, along with their directors as well as school administrators accepted the title. With that acceptance the Perry Theatre established a yearly mission and commitment to uphold the honor. The Perry Players perform at the Louie Mattachione Theatre at Perry High School, and were under the direction of Louie Mattachione for over 50 years until his retirement.

Notable alumni

 Matt Campbell: head football coach at Iowa State University
 Tyler Light: professional golfer
 Steve Luke: NCAA wrestling champion at Michigan
 Dustin Schlatter:  NCAA wrestling champion at Minnesota

References

High schools in Stark County, Ohio
Public high schools in Ohio